Chromium(III) chloride (also called chromic chloride) describes any of several chemical compounds with the formula CrCl3, where  can be 0, 5, and 6. The anhydrous compound with the formula CrCl3 is a violet solid.  The most common form of the trichloride is the dark green hexahydrate, CrCl3.  Chromium chlorides find use as catalysts and as precursors to dyes for wool.

Structure
Anhydrous chromium(III) chloride adopts the YCl3 structure, with Cr3+ occupying one third of the octahedral interstices in alternating layers of a pseudo-cubic close packed lattice of Cl− ions. The absence of cations in alternate layers leads to weak bonding between adjacent layers. For this reason, crystals of CrCl3 cleave easily along the planes between layers, which results in the flaky (micaceous) appearance of samples of chromium(III) chloride. If pressurized to 9.9 GPa it goes under a phase transition.

Chromium(III) chloride hydrates
The hydrated chromium(III) chlorides display the somewhat unusual property of existing in a number of distinct chemical forms (isomers), which differ in terms of the number of chloride anions that are coordinated to Cr(III) and the water of crystallization. The different forms exist both as solids and in aqueous solutions. Several members are known of the series of [CrCl3−z(H2O)n]z+.  The common hexahydrate can be more precisely described as [CrCl2(H2O)4]Cl.  It consists of the cation trans-[CrCl2(H2O)4]+ and additional molecules of water and a chloride anion in the lattice.  Two other hydrates are known, pale green [CrCl(H2O)5]Cl2 and violet [Cr(H2O)6]Cl3.  Similar isomerism is seen with other chromium(III) compounds.

Preparation
Anhydrous chromium(III) chloride may be prepared by chlorination of chromium metal directly, or indirectly by carbothermic chlorination of chromium(III) oxide at 650–800 °C

Cr2O3 + 3 C + 3 Cl2 → 2 CrCl3 + 3 CO

The hydrated chlorides are prepared by treatment of chromate with hydrochloric acid and aqueous methanol.

Reactions
Slow reaction rates are common with chromium(III) complexes. The low reactivity of the d3 Cr3+ ion can be explained using crystal field theory. One way of opening CrCl3 up to substitution in solution is to reduce even a trace amount to CrCl2, for example using zinc in hydrochloric acid. This chromium(II) compound undergoes substitution easily, and it can exchange electrons with CrCl3 via a chloride bridge, allowing all of the CrCl3 to react quickly.

With the presence of some chromium(II), however, solid CrCl3 dissolves rapidly in water. Similarly, ligand substitution reactions of solutions of [CrCl2(H2O)4]+ are accelerated by chromium(II) catalysts.

With molten alkali metal chlorides such as potassium chloride, CrCl3 gives salts of the type M3CrCl6 and K3Cr2Cl9, which is also octahedral but where the two chromiums are linked via three chloride bridges.

The hexahydrate can also be dehydrated with thionyl chloride:
CrCl3  +  6 SOCl2   →   CrCl3  +  6 SO2  +  12 HCl

Complexes with organic ligands
CrCl3 is a Lewis acid, classified as "hard" according to the Hard-Soft Acid-Base theory. It forms a variety of adducts of the type [CrCl3L3]z, where L is a Lewis base. For example, it reacts with pyridine to form the pyridine complex:
CrCl3 + 3 C5H5N → CrCl3(C5H5N)3

Treatment with trimethylsilylchloride in THF gives the anhydrous THF complex:
CrCl3  +  12 Me3SiCl   →   CrCl3(THF)3  +  6 (Me3Si)2O  +  12 HCl

Precursor to organochromium complexes
Chromium(III) chloride is used as the precursor to many organochromium compounds, for example bis(benzene)chromium, an analogue of ferrocene:

Phosphine complexes derived from CrCl3 catalyse the trimerization of ethylene to 1-hexene.

Use in organic synthesis
One niche use of CrCl3 in organic synthesis is for the in situ preparation of chromium(II) chloride, a reagent for the reduction of alkyl halides and for the synthesis of (E)-alkenyl halides. The reaction is usually performed using two moles of CrCl3 per mole of lithium aluminium hydride, although if aqueous acidic conditions are appropriate zinc and hydrochloric acid may be sufficient.

Chromium(III) chloride has also been used as a Lewis acid in organic reactions, for example to catalyse the nitroso Diels-Alder reaction.

Dyestuffs
A number of chromium-containing dyes are used commercially for wool.  Typical dyes are triarylmethanes consisting of ortho-hydroxylbenzoic acid derivatives.

Precautions
Although trivalent chromium is far less poisonous than hexavalent, chromium salts are generally considered toxic.

References

Further reading
Handbook of Chemistry and Physics, 71st edition, CRC Press, Ann Arbor, Michigan, 1990.
The Merck Index, 7th edition, Merck & Co, Rahway, New Jersey, USA, 1960.
J. March, Advanced Organic Chemistry, 4th ed., p. 723, Wiley, New York, 1992.
K. Takai, in Handbook of Reagents for Organic Synthesis, Volume 1: Reagents, Auxiliaries and Catalysts for C-C Bond Formation, (R. M. Coates, S. E. Denmark, eds.), pp. 206–211, Wiley, New York, 1999.

External links

International Chemical Safety Card 1316 (anhydr. CrCl3)
International Chemical Safety Card 1532 (CrCl3·6H2O)
National Pollutant Inventory – Chromium (III) compounds fact sheet
NIOSH Pocket Guide to Chemical Hazards
IARC Monograph "Chromium and Chromium compounds"

Chromium(III) compounds
Chlorides
Metal halides
Coordination complexes